Full Blown Chaos is a metalcore band from Floral Park, Queens, New York. According to the band, their whole direction "is to keep a wide range of music, not to necessarily pigeonhole ourselves into metal or hardcore". They are well respected in the New York scene, and are generally considered to be a part of the New York Hardcore movement.

History
Full Blown Chaos self-released their first EP in 2001, with the lineup of Joe White (vocals), Mike Facci (guitar), Ed Conroy (bass), and Jeff Facci (drums), on Conroy's Jailhouse Records label. It is considered one of their best releases by the underground hardcore community. With White on vocals, the EP represented the band in their prime and set the foundation for the band's style. By the time they released their second EP, Prophet of Hostility, on Hatebreed frontman Jamey Jasta's Stillborn Records, White was replaced by new vocalist Ray Mazzola who was the co-vocalist for 36 Deadly Fists, a hardcore outfit out of Queens, New York.

On October 19, 2004, Full Blown Chaos released Wake the Demons and have since toured with such acts as Hatebreed, Terror, Sick of It All, Madball, Himsa, Napalm Death and many others. Wake the Demons was described as "songs of inner-strength, backed with riffage that hug hairpin turns and a dynamite-triggering rhythm section."

In 2006, Full Blown Chaos released their follow up, Within the Grasp of Titans with Eric Rachel on producer/engineer duties. The theme of songs of inner-strength was present on this album as well. They also joined the Ozzfest 2006 tour during the summer.

On June 8, 2007, Full Blown Chaos announced a new deal with Ferret Music, and their first offering with the label, Heavy Lies the Crown, was released August 21, 2007.

Full blown Chaos has played the New England Metal and Hardcore Festival in 2003, 2004, 2005, 2006, and 2008. They have also released several compilation albums with bands such as Agnostic Front, Dog Eat Dog and Son of Skam.

Members
Current members
Ray Mazzola – vocals
Mike Facci – guitar
Jeff Facci – drums
Chris "Grits" Furr – bass

Former members
Mike "Lurk" Ruehle – bass
Joe White – vocals
Chris Morgan – vocals
Ed Conroy – bass
Paul Tavora – guitar
Dustin Jennings – bass
Mark Gumbrecht – lead guitar 

Temporary members
Desi McKee – bass (North American tour with Shai Hulud)
"Farmer" Dave Stauble – guitar (North American tour with Shai Hulud)
Tyrus James – bass (North American tour with See You Next Tuesday)
Wayne Sassano – guitar (North American tour with Knights of the Abyss and The Autumn Offering)
Chris "Grits" Furr – bass (North American tour with Trapped Under Ice)
Brandon Crane – bass (European tour with Bury Your Dead and Emmure)

Discography

Studio albums
Wake the Demons (2004)
Within the Grasp of Titans (2006)
Heavy Lies the Crown (2007)
Full Blown Chaos (2011)

EPs
Full Blown Chaos (2001)
Prophet of Hostility (2003)

Miscellaneous
Hellfest III (DVD)(CD-2) (2004)
9. Full Blown Chaos - No Others

Ozzfest 2006 (Sampler) (2006)
8. Full Blown Chaos - Solemn Promise

Icepick- Violent Epiphany (Bonus Disc) Stillborn Records Hardcore Street Volume 2 (2006)
6. Full Blown Chaos - Sentenced

Suck City Sampler 07 (2006)
30. Full Blown Chaos - Solemn Promise

You've Been Warned Volume 1 (2006)
3. Full Blown Chaos - Chopping Block

References

External links
 Full Blown Chaos Interview with Daily Dischord
 Stillborn Records
 Biography and Interview
 Full Blown Chaos at MySpace

Metalcore musical groups from New York (state)
Musical groups established in 2000
Musical groups from Queens, New York
Hardcore punk groups from New York (state)
Ferret Music artists